Benton is a Tyne and Wear Metro station, serving the suburb of Benton, North Tyneside in Tyne and Wear, England. It joined the network on 11 August 1980, following the opening of the first phase of the network, between Haymarket and Tynemouth via Four Lane Ends.

History
The station originally opened on 27 June 1864 under the Blyth and Tyne Railway. It was resited on 1 March 1871 by the North Eastern Railway. Following closure for conversion in the late 1970s, the original station building on the westbound platform was retained, and now serves as a private residence.

Prior to the network's extension to Wearside in March 2002, Benton was a terminus station of the former Red Line, which operated between Pelaw and Benton. The station still serves as a terminus for Yellow Line trains from Pelaw during peak hours. However, following the opening of Northumberland Park in December 2005, many of these trains now continue to Monkseaton.

The station was used by 348,120 passengers in 2017–18.

Facilities
Step-free access is available at all stations across the Tyne and Wear Metro network, with ramped access to platforms. Two lifts, which were installed in 2011, provide step-free access over the footbridge between platforms. The station is equipped with ticket machines, waiting shelter, seating, next train information displays, timetable posters, and an emergency help point on both platforms. Ticket machines are able to accept payment with credit and debit card (including contactless payment), notes and coins. The station is also fitted with smartcard validators, which feature at all stations across the network.

A small free car park is available, with ten spaces, plus two accessible spaces. There is also the provision for cycle parking, with five cycle pods available for use.

Services 
, the station is served by up to five trains per hour on weekdays and Saturday, and up to four trains per hour during the evening and on Sunday.

Rolling stock used: Class 599 Metrocar

References

External links
 
 Timetable and station information for Benton

Metropolitan Borough of North Tyneside
1871 establishments in England
Railway stations in Great Britain opened in 1871
1980 establishments in England
Railway stations in Great Britain opened in 1980
Tyne and Wear Metro Yellow line stations
Transport in Tyne and Wear
Former North Eastern Railway (UK) stations
